Central Warehousing Corporation is a statutory body which was established under ‘The Warehousing Corporations Act, 1962. It is a public warehouse operator established by the Government of India in 1957 to provide logistics support to the agricultural sector. It operates 422 warehouses across India with a storage capacity of 10 million tonnes. Services include foodgrain warehouses, industrial warehousing, custom bonded warehouses, container freight stations, inland clearance depots and air-cargo complexes.

Function
The Warehousing Corporation act, 1962:Subject to the provisions of this Act, the Central Warehousing Corporation may:
	
Subscribe to the share capital of a State Warehousing Corporation;
Act as agent of the Government for the purposes of the purchase, sale, storage and distribution of agricultural produce, seeds, manures, fertilizers, agricultural implements and notified commodities; and
Carry out such other functions as may be prescribed.

The Warehousing Corporation (Amendment) Bill, 2011 has been proposed in the Lok Sabha by the Ministry of Consumer Affairs, Food and Public Distribution seeking to make Mini-Ratna company Central Warehousing Corporation (CWC) an independent body without government being a guarantor.

Operation
CWC operations include scientific storage and handling services for more than 400 commodities include Agricultural produce, Industrial raw-materials, finished goods and variety of hygroscopic and perishable items.

 Scientific Storage Facilities for commodities including hygroscopic and perishable items through network of 421 warehouses in India with its 2880 personnel.
 Import and Export Warehousing facilities at its 36 Container Freight Stations in ports and inland stations.
 Bonded Warehousing facilities.
 Disinfestation services.
 Handling, Transportation & Storage of ISO Containers.
CWC enables the movement of imported and exportable goods to and from the port towns and has developed infrastructure of Container Freight Stations & Inland Clearance Depots throughout the country. It operates 36 CFSs/ ICDs where composite services for containerised movement of import/export cargo are provided.
The Warehousing Corporation is empowered to acquire and build Warehouses for storage of Agricultural produce, seeds, fertilizers and other notified commodities and also to act as an agent of the Central Warehousing Corporation or of the Government, for the purpose of purchases, sales storage, distribution etc., of Agricultural Commodities in time of need. Though it has been criticised for lack of manpower and technologically equipped warehousing facility.

References

Government-owned companies of India
Companies based in New Delhi
Business services companies established in 1956
Logistics companies of India
Ministry of Consumer Affairs, Food and Public Distribution
Warehouses
Indian companies established in 1956
1956 establishments in Delhi